Martin Isaksson (1921–2001), was Governor of Åland from 1972 to 1982. He had previously served as Lantråd of Åland from 1967 to 1972. Later, he served as Finnish Ambassador to Iceland.

References

Premiers of Åland
Ambassadors of Finland to Iceland
1921 births
2001 deaths
20th-century Finnish politicians
20th-century diplomats